The Supercopa de España de Baloncesto 2012 was the 9th edition of this tournament. It is also called Supercopa Endesa for sponsorship reasons.

It was played in the Pabellón Príncipe Felipe in Zaragoza. Real Madrid was the champion after defeating FC Barcelona Regal, the defending champion.

Participant teams
Participant teams were known officially on 18 June 2012.

Semifinals
The draw of semifinals was made on 6 September 2012.

Final

References

External links
 Liga ACB website

Supercopa de España de Baloncesto
2012–13 in Spanish basketball cups